The Human Exploitation and Organised Crime Command (SCD9) is a branch of the Specialist Crime Directorate within London's Metropolitan Police Service. The SCD9 is primarily tasked with investigating human trafficking, and also has responsibility for policing prostitution, obscene publications, nightclubs, vice, casino fraud, money laundering and identity fraud.

Formation
On 29 October 2009, the Metropolitan Police Authority (MPA) received a report on the MPS review into investigation of human trafficking. The report  profiled the units investigating these crimes: the clubs and vice unit (CO14), then part of Central Operations; and the Human Trafficking Team (HTT), then part of Operation Maxim with a remit to investigate organised immigration crime.

References

External links
Operation MAXIM

Metropolitan Police units
Human trafficking in the United Kingdom
2010 establishments in the United Kingdom